Adam Svensson (born December 31, 1993) is a Canadian professional golfer.

Amateur career
Svensson was born in Surrey, British Columbia to Frank Svensson and Tina Nilsson and attended Earl Marriott Secondary School. He spent six years with the National men's amateur and development squads, winning a bronze medal representing Canada at the 2010 Toyota Junior Golf World Cup and silver at the 2014 Eisenhower Trophy in Karuizawa, Japan, together with Corey Conners and Taylor Pendrith. He shot a bogey-free course-record 7-under par 64 in final round to win the 2012 Canadian Boys Junior Championship at Osprey Ridge Golf Club in Nova Scotia.

Svensson left his mark in collegiate golf at NCAA Division II Barry University in Florida, winning nine times, earning two NCAA First-Team All-American honours, and winning the NCAA Division II Men's Golf Team Championships in 2013 and 2014. He won the Phil Mickelson Award as Most Outstanding Freshman in 2013 and was named the Jack Nicklaus Player of the Year in 2013/14. Svensson was the third-ranked amateur in Canada prior to his pro announcement.

Professional career
In 2015 Svensson left college after his junior year to turn professional and play on the Canadian Tour, where he was runner-up twice, including losing a playoff to Drew Weaver at the PC Financial Open. He medaled at the Web.com Tour qualifying school in December 2015, giving him fully-exempt status for the 2016 season. He won his first Web.com Tour title in January 2018 at The Bahamas Great Abaco Classic and finished 14th on the regular-season money list to earn his PGA Tour card for the 2019 season. He lost his PGA Tour card after his rookie season, finishing 167th in the FedEx Cup standings. Back on the now-renamed Korn Ferry Tour, he won the Club Car Championship in March 2021. In August 2021, Svensson won the Nationwide Children's Hospital Championship as part of the Korn Ferry Tour Finals. While he had already secured a PGA Tour card for next season, the win improved Svensson's priority status for the PGA Tour in the 2021–22 season.

In November 2022, Svensson won his first PGA Tour event at the RSM Classic, shooting a six-under 64 in the final round to beat Brian Harman, Callum Tarren and Sahith Theegala by two shots.

Amateur wins
 2010 British Columbia Amateur, Canadian Juvenile Boys Championship, British Columbia Junior Boys Championship, CN Future Links Pacific Championship, Callaway World Junior Golf Championship
 2011 British Columbia Junior Boys Championship
 2012 Canadian Boys Junior Championship
Source:

Professional wins (4)

PGA Tour wins (1)

Korn Ferry Tour wins (3)

Korn Ferry Tour playoff record (1–0)

Results in The Players Championship

"T" indicates a tie for a place

Team appearances
Amateur
Toyota Junior Golf World Cup (representing Canada): 2010
Eisenhower Trophy (representing Canada): 2014

See also
2018 Web.com Tour Finals graduates
2021 Korn Ferry Tour Finals graduates

References

External links

Canadian male golfers
Barry Buccaneers men's golfers
PGA Tour golfers
Korn Ferry Tour graduates
Golfing people from British Columbia
Sportspeople from Surrey, British Columbia
1993 births
Living people